Nathan A. Freese (born August 18, 1990) is a former American football placekicker. He was drafted by the Detroit Lions in the seventh round of the 2014 NFL Draft. He played college football at Boston College.

College career
Freese chose to attend Boston College to play college football. He would serve as the placekicker for the Eagles.

NFL career
Freese was drafted by the Detroit Lions in the seventh round (229th overall) of the 2014 NFL Draft. During the 2014 Training Camp for the Lions, Freese beat out teammate Giorgio Tavecchio for the kicker position. However, after his fourth missed field goal attempt in the first three weeks of the regular season, the Lions released Freese on September 22, 2014.

External links
Boston College Eagles bio

1990 births
Living people
American football placekickers
Boston College Eagles football players
Detroit Lions players
People from Strongsville, Ohio
Players of American football from Ohio
Sportspeople from Cuyahoga County, Ohio